Tropidophis, common name wood snakes or West Indian wood snakes, is a genus of dwarf boas endemic to the West Indies and South America. Currently, either 17 or 33 species are recognized, depending on the authority.

Description
They are secretive and predominantly terrestrial, found in a variety of natural habitats, including rain forest, swamps, pine woods and scrub, as well as in the vicinity of human habitation. They have an interesting defensive habit of Autohaemorrhaging from the mouth, nostrils and eyes when disturbed. Some species also change colour over the course of the day.

Despite their relatively small size and secretive nature, some species may be susceptible to extirpation, mainly due to habitat alteration and introduced feral animals. The Navassa Island dwarf boa (T. bucculentus) has not been seen for 100 years and is believed to be extinct.

Distribution and habitat
Found in the West Indies, including Cuba, and in South America (Brazil, Peru and Ecuador).

Species

) Not including the nominate subspecies.
T) Type species.

The Reptile Database includes these further species:

) Not including the nominate subspecies.

There are currently 33 species, in which 26 of them are West Indian and 15 of them are Cuban. The 15 species in Cuba are the most diverse.

References

Further reading
Bibron G (1843). In: de la Sagra R (1843). Historia fisica, politica y natural de la isla de Cuba. Segunda parte historia natural. Tomo IV. Reptiles y peces. Paris: Bertrand. 255 pp. + Plates I-V. (Tropidophis, new genus, p. 124). (in Spanish).
Boulenger GA (1893). Catalogue of the Snakes in the British Museum (Natural History). Volume I., Containing the Families ... Boidæ ... London: Trustees of the British Museum (Natural History). (Taylor and Francis, printers). xiii + 448 pp. + Plates I-XXVIII. (Genus Ungalia [=Tropidophis], p. 110).
Freiberg M (1982). Snakes of South America. Hong Kong: T.F.H. Publications. 189 pp. . (Genus Tropidophis, pp. 44, 80, 88, 188).
Schwartz A, Thomas R (1975). A Check-list of West Indian Amphibians and Reptiles. Carnegie Museum of Natural History Special Publication No. 1. Pittsburgh, Pennsylvania: Carnegie Museum of Natural History. 216 pp. (12 species of Tropidophis, pp. 191–196).

External links

Tropidophiidae
Snake genera
Taxa named by Gabriel Bibron